General John Hale (1728–1806) was a British army officer, who is remembered chiefly for his close friendship with General James Wolfe, and for his exceptionally large number of children by his wife Mary Chaloner, a noted beauty who was painted by Joshua Reynolds.

Career 
As a very young officer, he played a part in suppressing the 1745 Rebellion, an experience which is said to have given him a lifelong aversion to the Scottish nation. He was stationed at Fort Edward earned distinction as a captain in 1755 at the siege of Fort Beauséjour. He later took part in the Siege of Louisbourg as the commander of the 47th Regiment of Foot under James Wolfe. He also commanded the regiment in the Battle of the Plains of Abraham. He was a close friend of General James Wolfe, and it was Hale whom the dying Wolfe ordered to carry his final dispatches back to England. Hale received a grant of Crown lands in Canada, where several of his sons later settled.

John Hale co-owned the privateer Musketo, 120 tons, eighty men, and the Hertford. These vessels sailed on their first cruise in November 1756. The regiment was renumbered the 17th Lancers in 1761. That year they were stationed in Scotland, where Hale's proverbial dislike of Scots people caused him to become engaged in a serious fracas with a toll-keeper, which might have had ended fatally. He was not disgraced, but was personally reprimanded for his conduct by King George III. The following year he acted as secretary to Earl of Albemarle during the Battle of Havana. After 1762 he gradually withdrew from regimental affairs, due it seems to quarrels with some of his fellow officers. In politics he was something of a reformer, and during the Yorkshire by-election of 1785, he made a celebrated speech which was considered by most of the electorate to be dangerously radical.

Hale was promoted major-general in 1772, lieutenant-general in 1777 and general in 1793. He was appointed Governor of Londonderry in 1776, holding that office until his death in 1806.

Family

He was born in London in 1728, the youngest son of the eminent judge Sir Bernard Hale, former Chief Baron of the Irish Exchequer and his wife Anne Thoresby of Northampton; his father died a few months after he was born. General Bernard Hale was his elder brother. The Hale family came originally from King's Walden in Hertfordshire, and were prominent in local politics for generations.

John married in 1763 Mary Chaloner, daughter of William Chaloner III of Guisborough and his wife Mary Finny; she died in 1803. They had twenty-one children, ten sons and eleven daughters. Of their children William, John, Richard, George, Francis, Henry, Bernard, Vicesimus, Edward, Thomas, Emily, Elizabeth, Mary, Anne, Fanny, Catherine, Charlotte, Octavia, Jane and Harriet survived infancy and seventeen of the twenty-one outlived their father. Hale bought a farm near Guisborough which he renamed Plantation House, and where the family grew up.

His daughter Harriet married Lawrence Dundas, 1st Earl of Zetland. Her sister Anne married Henry Walker Yeoman, and Mary married Thomas Lewin. Of his sons, John junior had a distinguished political career in Canada. Richard became Vicar of Harewood, a living which was in the gift of his uncle Lord Harewood, and Vicesimus was a judge in India. Francis and Edward were clothiers. None of the General's sons held high military office.

Hale was not a rich man, and there is good reason to believe that he had some difficulty in providing for so large a family. Although his wife was the sister of a Countess, her own will shows that some of the younger sons were badly provided for.

There is a celebrated portrait of Mary Chaloner Hale as Euphrosyne, one of the three Graces, by Sir Joshua Reynolds, who also painted her husband. It now hangs in Harewood House, the home of her sister Anne, who married Edward Lascelles, 1st Earl of Harewood.

References 

1728 births
1806 deaths
Military personnel from London
British Army generals
17th Lancers officers
British Army personnel of the Jacobite rising of 1745
47th Regiment of Foot officers
British Army personnel of the French and Indian War
British Army personnel of the Seven Years' War